Arjun Kapikad is an Indian actor and singer, who appears in Tulu films and Kannada film industries. He made his acting debut with the 2012 movie, Telikeda Bolli.

Filmography

Awards

Red FM Tulu Film Award 2014 - Best Actor for Telikeda Bolli
Tulu Cinemotsava Awards 2015 -Best Actor(public choice) for Rang
Tulu Cinemotsava Awards 2015 -Best Emerging Actor

List of Tulu Movies Links

Karnataka State Film Award for Best Regional film
RED FM Tulu Film Awards
Tulu Cinemotsava 2015

References

External links

Living people
Year of birth missing (living people)
Male actors in Kannada cinema
Indian male film actors
Male actors in Tulu cinema
21st-century Indian male actors